Ding Yaping (born in 1967), not to be confused with Deng Yaping, is a female Chinese and German former international table tennis player.

She won bronze medal's at the 1989 World Table Tennis Championships and the 1991 World Table Tennis Championships in the women's doubles with Li Jun.

She later represented Germany.

See also
 List of table tennis players
 List of World Table Tennis Championships medalists

References

German female table tennis players
Living people
1967 births
Chinese female table tennis players
Naturalised table tennis players
Sportspeople from Ningbo
Table tennis players from Zhejiang
World Table Tennis Championships medalists